Salkin & Linoff was a St. Louis Park, Minnesota-based retailer of primarily private label women's, junior (and to a lesser extent) men's and children's clothes. The retailer had a wide variety of store name plates, including S&L, Bostwicks, Peck & Peck, Stevensons, Wrangler Wroost, Hurrah!, Morrey Alan (later shortened to Morrey A), Nina B, Bostwicks for Men, Bostwicks for Women and Mauritizos. The company filled the void in smaller midwest cities and competed with moderate retailers (e.g. J.C. Penney's) while providing a similar merchandise mix but with a "small-town" feel.

The company was founded as a one-room shop in Elkton, South Dakota in 1921 by Joseph Linoff and Samuel F. Salkin. Salkin & Linoff grew to one of the largest independent clothing retailer with 400+ stores across the contential United States. Under the leadership of Sam Salkin's son Morrey, the company continued to grow through the late 1980s but the growth stopped when aggressive growth of new store openings could not mask volume and profitability problems. Key field managers feared the technology momentum needed to enable point-of-sale (POS) throughout their locations nationwide would not be attempted due to cost (and it never was implemented) and that inability was a symptom for the declining business model of the company.

An interesting make-up of stores in the marketplace showed Salkin & Linoff to be a multi-dimensional combination of stores. This business model, plus senior management ineptitude combined to force S&L out of business in 1990. The majority of the chain stores were shut down and a few small surviving stores sold off.  A unique antique collection of store furnishings that were procured from around the world over the years by designer Richard (Dicky) Dordon were auctioned.

The primary flaw centered on the wide mix of selections (thus, limited any particular impact), the inability to be flexible in the smaller towns, while competing against local owner/operators, caused much of the demise. Some specific surviving stores Peck & Peck chain were sold in the mid/late 1980s to H.C. Prange.

The company filed for Chapter 11 bankruptcy in 1990 and closed in 1991.

References

Defunct retail companies of the United States
Clothing retailers of the United States
Defunct companies based in Minnesota
1921 establishments in South Dakota
1991 disestablishments in Minnesota
American companies established in 1921
Retail companies established in 1921
Retail companies disestablished in 1991
Companies that filed for Chapter 11 bankruptcy in 1990